Pleuvezain is a commune in the Vosges department in Grand Est in northeastern France.

Inhabitants are called Pluvuisiens in French.

See also
Communes of the Vosges department

References

Communes of Vosges (department)